The 2021 Verizon 200 at the Brickyard was a NASCAR Cup Series race that was held on August 15, 2021, at Indianapolis Motor Speedway in Speedway, Indiana. It was the inaugural running of the Verizon 200 on the road course, and officially the 28th edition of NASCAR at the Speedway. Contested over 95 laps -- extended from 82 laps due to an overtime finish, on the  road course, it was the 24th race of the 2021 NASCAR Cup Series season.

This race marked the first time a NASCAR Cup Series race was contested on the infield road course after the 2020 Xfinity Series race was held there the previous year as part of the INDYCAR/NASCAR doubleheader.

A. J. Allmendinger earned his first victory since 2014, as well as his second career NASCAR Cup Series victory, and the race also marked the first career NASCAR Cup Series victory for Kaulig Racing.

Report

Background

The Indianapolis Motor Speedway, located in Speedway, Indiana, (an enclave suburb of Indianapolis) in the United States, is the home of the Indianapolis 500 and the Brickyard 400.

Constructed in 1909, it is the original speedway, the first racing facility so named. It has a permanent seating capacity estimated at 235,000 with infield seating raising capacity to an approximate 400,000. It is the highest-capacity sports venue in the world.

After running the support races last year on the road course, the Speedway moved the Cup Series feature division to the road course configuration. As a result, the July 4 weekend spot it held was occupied by Road America and the race was moved to mid-August.  As was the case during the pandemic-affected 2020 season, the NTT IndyCar Series will race on the Saturday card with the Big Machine Spiked Coolers Grand Prix.  The events were part of four different divisions of racing within a week at the Speedway, with the Bryan Clauson Classic midget car events at the Speedway the next week.

Prior to the race, NASCAR had the rumble strip on turn 6 removed after it caused severe damage to several cars during the first lap of the Xfinity race the day before.

Entry list
 (R) denotes rookie driver.
 (i) denotes driver who are ineligible for series driver points.

Practice

Practice results

Qualifying

Byron was the only driver in the 1:27 range during the entire event, and the first NASCAR race car to exceed 100 MPH average speed on the road course.

Qualifying results

Race

William Byron won the pole in qualifying for the first Cup race on the Indianapolis Road Course. Pit strategy came into play for the start of the race, allowing Tyler Reddick to win both stages while Martin Truex Jr. suffered tire issues and Brad Keselowski spun into the wall. Late in the race, Byron spun with Kyle Busch while Joey Logano and Daniel Suárez both got into the tire barrier (the accident turned out to be because the curbing at Turn 5 came up). On the restart, Reddick made contact with teammate Austin Dillon and collected Cole Custer and Alex Bowman. In overtime, Chase Briscoe exceeded track limits while battling Denny Hamlin for the lead and was called for a penalty, then spun Hamlin (Briscoe said after the race that he wasn't told about the penalty.) A. J. Allmendinger took advantage and took the lead and held off Ryan Blaney for his second career Cup victory and the first Cup win for Kaulig Racing.

Stage Results

Stage One
Laps: 15

Stage Two
Laps: 20

Final Stage Results

Stage Three
Laps: 47

After finishing third and Hamlin finishing twenty-third, Larson took the lead in the regular-season points standings. Hamlin however was able to officially qualify in the Cup Playoffs based on points.

Race statistics
 Lead changes: 13 among 11 different drivers
 Cautions/Laps: 6 for 25
 Red flags: 2 for 23 minutes and 22 seconds
 Time of race: 3 hours, 20 minutes and 59 seconds
 Average speed:

Media

Television
NBC Sports covered the race on the television side as part of a Radio Style Broadcast for the race. Rick Allen, and Steve Letarte called the race from the broadcast booth. MRN broadcaster Mike Bagley called the race from Turn 1, Dale Earnhardt Jr. had the call from Turn 7, and Jeff Burton had the call from Turn 12. Dave Burns, Marty Snider, and Kelli Stavast handled the pit road duties from pit lane. Rutledge Wood handled the features from the track.

Radio
Indianapolis Motor Speedway Radio Network and the Performance Racing Network jointly co-produce the radio broadcast for the race, which was be simulcast on Sirius XM NASCAR Radio, and air on IMS or PRN stations, depending on contractual obligations. The lead announcers and two pit reporters are PRN staff, while the turns announcers and two pit reporters are from IMS.

Standings after the race

Drivers' Championship standings

Manufacturers' Championship standings

Note: Only the first 16 positions are included for the driver standings.
. – Driver has clinched a position in the NASCAR Cup Series playoffs.

References

2021 Verizon 200 at the Brickyard
Verizon 200
Verizon 200
Verizon 200